27-Norcholestane, is a chemical compound with formula , that is a steroid derivative. 27-Norcholestane is used as a biomarker to constrain the source age of sediments and petroleum through the ratio between 24-norcholestane and 27-norcholestane (norcholestane ratio, NCR), especially when used with other age diagnostic biomarkers, like oleanane.

See also 

 Biomarker
 Cholestane
 Nor-

References 

Steroids
Biomarkers